Barnt Green railway station serves the village of Barnt Green, North Worcestershire, England. The station, and all trains serving it, are operated by West Midlands Trains.

It has platforms on both lines, until 2018 only the Redditch line platforms saw regular services, however since Cross-City Line services were extended to Bromsgrove, the main line platforms now also see regular use.

History

The main line through Barnt Green was built and opened by the Birmingham and Gloucester Railway in 1841, but it would be 1844 before Barnt Green received its station. The B&GR was linked to the Bristol and Gloucester Railway in 1845 to create a through route to the West Country and then became part of the Midland Railway's expanding network in 1846. The Midland then opened a second route into Birmingham New Street (the Birmingham West Suburban Railway) in 1885 to provide an alternative to the original B&GR main line via Camp Hill, which was becoming increasingly congested at its eastern end (which it shared with the LNWR main line from Euston and the Midland's own route from ).

Though the station was used as an interchange between the two lines from the outset, its main line platforms were initially staggered - the northbound platform being located north of the junction and initially connected to the two southbound ones by a foot crossing (which was replaced by a footbridge in 1895). A second platform on the branch was provided in 1894, when the first 350 yards from the junction were doubled.  A more comprehensive rebuilding scheme came in 1928, when the Cofton Tunnel was demolished and replaced by a wide cutting, so that the main line towards Northfield and Kings Norton could be quadrupled by the LMS (who had taken over ownership of the station at the 1923 Grouping).  This saw the Birmingham-bound platform relocated south of the junction to create the layout still in use today.

A correspondent who lived close to Barnt Green station from the Second World War onwards reminds us that it stood on an important NE-SW express route. It was part of the route of The Pines Express for a long time. As a child he would stand on the Worcester-Birmingham platform with his sister, seeing ambulance trains painted dark green with red crosses passing through. Other troop trains held American soldiers and when they saw us, they threw sweets and coins to us which came bouncing across the platform. At that time there was a large waiting room on that side with a ticket window, now removed. Close to that stood a green-painted W H Smith bookstall run by Mr. C. B. Fallick. On summer Saturdays the sound of holiday special trains climbing the Lickey Incline with their bankers was clearly audible and then shortly afterwards they would "burst out" from under the road bridge at the end of the platform. They were mostly hauled by Black Fives, sometimes a Patriot and occasionally a Midland Compound valiantly hauling one of those long trains. The compounds typically hauled most of the Birmingham-Worcester local trains and he would travel down and up the Lickey Incline to school once a day for six years, acquiring a lifelong love for those locomotives and the hollow bark of their exhaust. 

The Evesham loop line through Redditch and Evesham was used in Midland and LMS days as a relief route for freight traffic to avoid the steeply-graded Lickey Incline in addition to carrying local passenger traffic, but under British Rail auspices it was closed to passengers south of Redditch in October 1962 due to the poor condition of the track (formal closure occurring on 17 June 1963) and completely in July 1964.

The remaining part of the branch north of Redditch had seen its service dieselised and improved to hourly in April 1960, only for it to be listed for closure in the Beeching Report of 1963 along with Barnt Green station itself.  As a precursor to this, the timetable was drastically cut back in May 1964, with only a handful of (mostly) peak period services being retained.  However the route was eventually reprieved in August 1965 after protests from local rail users and the area's four MPs.

This frequency was increased to half-hourly in 1989 and in 1992 the route was electrified (though only the centre main lines were wired beyond Longbridge - the outer lines remain diesel-only and are designated as goods loops). A limited service has also returned to the mainline platforms in recent years, provided by trains on the New St - Worcester - Hereford line (see below).

Stationmasters
In January 1940, the station master Frank Wilson was fined 10s with 5s costs for allowing a light to shine from his house during blackout. 

J. Spreckley until 1860
William Moore from 1860 
George Vickers until 1868
James Nutt 1868 - 1889 
Frederick Witts 1889 - ca. 1914 (formerly station master at Water Orton)
Frank Wilson ca. 1940
S.C. Pugh until 1959 (afterwards station master at Severn Beach)
G. Limb from 1959  (formerly station master at Hunnington)

Services
Southbound Cross-City line services towards Redditch depart from Platform 4, at 20-minute intervals during the daytime but dropping to every half-hour after 20:00 (Monday-Friday, first train departs at 06:30; last train departs at 23:40). Services to  down the Lickey incline began on 29 July 2018, with a 20-minute service in operation from platform 2.

Northbound Cross-City line services towards Birmingham New Street and  depart alternately from Platform 3 and platform 1, at 10-minute intervals through the day/15 mins after 20:00 (Monday-Friday, first train departs at 06:23; last train departs at 23:08). These trains originate alternately at Redditch and Bromsgrove since the start of operations from the latter on 29 July 2018.

On Sundays there are 3tph to Birmingham New Street (2 from Redditch and 1 from Bromsgrove) with 2tph continuing to Lichfield Trent Valley.

The station is also served by a limited service on the Birmingham-Worcester Line (Monday-Friday only) to/from Worcester, Great Malvern and Hereford.

Facilities
The station has no permanent buildings (the building located behind shrubs adjacent to Platforms 2 and 3 is a private business, in no way affiliated with the station). It has automatic ticket machines located on platforms 3 and 4, and shelters are provided on Platforms 2, 3 and 4. A footbridge connects all four platforms, although there is no access for wheelchairs. There is step-free access to Platforms 1 and 4. The station has a small (charged) car park adjacent to Platform 4 provided jointly by Bromsgrove District Council/West Midlands Trains. The station along with all those located on the Cross-City line has departure boards showing real time train information, located on Platforms 3 and 4.

See also

References

Further reading

External links 

Railway stations in Worcestershire
DfT Category F1 stations
Former Midland Railway stations
Railway stations in Great Britain opened in 1844
Railway stations served by West Midlands Trains
Rail junctions in England